The Pekingese (also spelled Pekinese) is a breed of toy dog, originating in China. The breed was favored by royalty of the Chinese Imperial court as a companion dog, and its name refers to the city of Peking (Beijing) where the Forbidden City is located. The breed has several characteristics and health issues related to its unique appearance. Because of its desirable characteristics, the Pekingese has been part of the development of designer crossbreeds, such as the Peekapoo (crossed with a poodle) and Peke-a-tese (crossed with a Maltese).

Appearance

Modern breeders and dog show judges seem to prefer the long-haired type over the more traditional spaniel-type coat.

The Pekingese's flat face and large eyes are some of the breed's most obvious characteristics. The body is compact and low to the ground. Pekingese also have a muscular and durable body. The breed's unusual rolling gait may have been deliberately developed through selective breeding, to prevent the court dogs from wandering in ancient times.

Coat

All breed standards allow a wide range of color combinations. The majority of Pekingese are gold, red or sable. Cream, black, white, tan, black-and-tan and occasionally 'blue' or slate grey have appeared in the breed. The latter often has poor pigment and light eyes. Albino Pekingese (white with pink eyes) should not be bred due to health problems associated with albinism.

A black mask or a self-colored face is equally acceptable in show dogs. Regardless of coat color, the exposed skin of the muzzle, nose, lips and eye rims is black. Due to heavy shedding and to prevent mats, this double-coated breed requires frequent extensive grooming.
These smaller Pekingese are commonly referred to as "sleeve" Pekingese or just "sleeves". The name is taken from ancient times, when emperors would carry the smallest of the breed in their sleeves. A Pekingese over 14 lbs. is disqualified in the show ring.

The Pekingese is slightly longer than tall when measured from the forechest to the rear. The overall outline is an approximate ratio of 3 high to 5 long.

Health

The Pekingese has a median lifespan of 11.4 years in a UK Kennel Club survey.

The leading cause of death for Pekingese, as for many other Toy breeds, is trauma. Primary health concerns include neurological and cardiovascular defects, e.g., congestive heart failure. When diagnosed early and successfully treated with medication, a Pekingese with this condition can live many years. A heart murmur is a potential indicator, and must be evaluated by a veterinary cardiologist. Often the murmur does not surface until the dog is six years old, so it is difficult to screen in a puppy.

As a result of breeding for an increasingly flattened face, its brachycephaly can lead to health issues in some Pekingese. Therefore other potential concerns in the breed are eye issues and breathing problems, resulting from its tiny skull and flattened face. Furthermore, skin allergies (including hotspots) and eye ulcers may develop spontaneously. Pekingese may also develop keratoconjunctivitis sicca (dry eye) progressive retinal atrophy, along with glaucoma, in which buildup of ocular fluid places pressure on the eye, resulting in drainage. Improper development of the eye's filtration angles is the leading cause.

The Pekingese must be kept indoors, as their flattened faces and nasal structure can cause them to develop breathing problems, making it difficult for them to regulate their body temperature in hot weather. Their long spines, relative to their legs, make them vulnerable to back injuries. Care should be taken when picking them up to give adequate support to the back: one hand under the chest, the other under the abdomen. As an achondroplasiac breed, some Pekingese find stairs difficult, and older dogs may not be able to go up or down stairs alone. To avoid injury, they should also be discouraged or prevented from leaping from furniture and other heights; pet stairs may be useful to access beds.

In an effort to address potential breathing difficulties caused by the breed's flat face, the Kennel Club (UK) significantly changed the breed standard in October 2008, removing the clause that the "profile [should be] flat with nose well up between eyes" and adding instead that the "muzzle must be evident". This was in response to public opinion following the BBC programme, Pedigree Dogs Exposed. The breed standards of two other brachycephalic breeds, the Pug and English Bulldog, were soon also changed.

Care

Keeping the Pekingese coat healthy and presentable requires daily brushing and a trip to the groomer every 8–12 weeks. Dogs intended as a house pet may be kept in a puppy cut, which requires less maintenance than a show coat. It is important to remove foreign materials from the eyes daily, and clean the creases on the face to prevent sores (hot spots). It is also necessary to keep and maintain the long fur in the rear end (aka the "trousers" or "skirt") clean and well-groomed, as the area is prone to soiling. In cold climates, the trousers may accumulate clumps of snowballs.

Due to their abundance of fur, it is important to keep the Pekingese cool. The breed is prone to have heatstroke when exposed to high temperatures.

Pekingese exercise needs are minimal. Due to their extremely short snouts, they are at a higher risk for breathing difficulties (most notably brachycephalic obstructed airway syndrome). Because of this, they are rarely capable of more than 30 minutes of exercise per day. It is important to monitor their breathing while exercising, especially if in the heat. If the Pekingese begins wheezing, exercise should cease immediately. After running, they should rest in a cool place until their breathing returns to normal. They must have access to plenty of water before, during, and after exercise to prevent overheating and dehydration.

History

The breed emerged in China from several kinds of small dog owned by aristocratic families. Unlike the others, it could only be owned by members of the Chinese Imperial Palace.

During the Second Opium War, in 1860, the Old Summer Palace in Beijing was sacked and set ablaze by a combined Anglo-French expeditionary force, after the Xianfeng Emperor had fled with all of his court members to Chengde.

A British soldier, Captain John Hart Dunne came across a lone pekingese, which he brought back to England. It was the first of the breed to survive the voyage. He presented her to Queen Victoria, who named it Looty.

It is often said that during the sack of the palace grounds, a contingent of British and French troops entered one of the palaces. An elderly aunt of the emperor had remained behind, but when the troops entered the palace she committed suicide. She was found dead with five Pekingese beside her body. They were taken by the troops before the Summer Palace was burnt to the ground. Lord John Hay took a pair, later called Schloff and Hytien, and gave them to his sister, the Duchess of Wellington, wife of Henry Wellesley, 3rd Duke of Wellington. Sir George Fitzroy took another pair, and gave them to his cousins, the Duke and Duchess of Richmond and Gordon. The fifth was the one found by captain Dunne. However the tale has no support from contemporary documents, while both Hay and Fitzroy may well have acquired pekes from some source, they were serving Naval officers expected to stay with their ships guarding the entrance to Beijing.

The Empress Dowager Cixi presented Pekingese to several Americans, including John Pierpont Morgan and Alice Lee Roosevelt Longworth, daughter of Theodore Roosevelt, who named it Manchu.

The first Pekingese in Ireland was introduced by Dr. Heuston. He established smallpox vaccination clinics in China. The effect was dramatic. In gratitude, the Chinese minister, Li Hongzhang presented him with a pair of Pekingese. They were named Chang and Lady Li. Dr. Heuston founded the Greystones kennel.

Around the turn of the century, Pekingese dogs became popular in Western countries. They were owned by such arbiters of fashion as Alexandra of Denmark, wife of Edward VII, and Elsie de Wolfe, popular American interior decorator. Later, they were owned by Rumer Godden, who wrote in her autobiography that "I do not like dogs except very large ones and one or two with such character that they cannot be denied; Pekingese are not dogs but something more" and by Auberon Waugh, who on one occasion fancifully boasted that one of his dogs shared his love of The Daily Telegraph and hatred for The Sunday Times.

In recent years, their popularity has declined, eclipsed by similar breeds such as the Shih Tzu. However, in 2021 a Pekingese named Wasabi won the Westminster dog show, the fourth time a Pekingese won Best in Show at Westminster.

Sleeve Pekingese

According to the 1948 publication Dogs In Britain, A Description of All Native Breeds and Most Foreign Breeds in Britain by Clifford LB Hubbard, the Sleeve Pekingese is a true miniature of the standard-sized dog, and was also known as the Miniature Pekingese. The name Sleeve Pekingese came from the custom of carrying these small dogs in the capacious sleeves of the robes worn by members of the Chinese Imperial Household. Hubbard indicated that this tradition appeared to be early Italian rather than Chinese, but its adoption by the Chinese Imperial Household led to dogs being bred as small as possible and to practices aimed at stunting their growth: giving puppies rice wine, holding newborns tightly for hours at a time or putting the puppies into tight-fitting wire mesh waistcoats. These practices were apparently forbidden by Dowager Empress Cixi.

In Hubbard's time, the term Sleeve was applied in Britain to a miniature Pekingese no more than 6–7 pounds in weight, often appearing to be only about 3–4 pounds. Mrs Flander's Mai Mai weighed only a little over 4 pounds and many other breeders had bred true miniatures of a similar size. He noted that miniatures may appear in a litter bred from full-sized Pekingese and were exhibited in classes for dogs less than 7 pounds at the major dog shows in Britain. In 1946 (when Hubbard wrote his book), the Sleeve Pekingese had a strong following with the most popular colours being cream and white, with white being considered particularly attractive. He illustrated the description with a white Sleeve Pekingese bred by Mrs Aileen Adam.

Origin myths

There are two origin stories for the Pekingese. The more common one is The Lion and the Marmoset:

A lion and a marmoset fell in love, but the lion was too large. The Gods intervened to even up their sizes; in one version of the story they shrank the lion down, in another they enlarged the marmoset. The Pekingese was the result.

The other originating story is The Butterfly Lions:

A lioness fell in love with a butterfly. But they knew the difference in size was too much to overcome. Together they went to see the Buddha, who allowed their size to meet in the middle. From this, the Pekingese came, as brave as a lion yet as dainty as a butterfly.

In popular culture
 The breed is one of the main contenders in The Awefull Battle of the Pekes and the Pollicles, a humorous poem by T. S. Eliot which was later adapted for the musical Cats.
 In the books and television adaptations of veterinarian James Herriot's semi-autobiographical All Creatures Great and Small, the spoiled yet good-natured Pekingese Trickie Woo is his favorite patient.
 In Crazy Rich Asians, Goh Peik Lin's family owns three Pekingese named Astor, Vanderbilt and Rockefeller.

See also
 Dogs portal
 List of dog breeds
 Lion dance, a dance from China.

References

Citations

Bibliography
 Godden, Rumer. The Butterfly Lions: The Pekingese in History, legend and Art. Viking. 1977.

External links

 

FCI breeds
Dog breeds originating in China